The mund is a principle in Germanic tradition and law that can be crudely translated as "protection" and which grew as the prerogative of a Germanic tribe king or leader. It has been Latinized in mundium.

The word comes from Germanic *mundō (cf. Old English/Old Norse mund), 'hand; protection'.

The mund within the family
The mund is basically the leadership of an ancestor of a family, a family which is understood as all the people related by blood to this ancestor, exerted over all and each of the family members. The ancestor's responsibility is more aimed at the family as a whole than towards each member individually.

The mund manifests itself as a disciplinary power upon the members of the family; the tenant of the mund has to watch over the women's chastity and faithfulness to prevent the family honour from being harmed; whether a bride is not a virgin at the time of her departure from the family in the case of chastity, and whether sons are born that are not of the common blood in the case of faithfulness. It also has to control the male family members who may cast shame on the family honour, who may not serve the family, or who may endanger the whole family by their imprudence (for example by drawing the family into a feud). Thus the keeper of the mund can ban a member from the family.
In this aspect, it is a coercive power, an authority, but not understood as the Roman auctoritas.

It is also the responsibility to defend the family's well-being and existence from all dangers and offenses (be they against the body or the honour).

The mundium in Germanic Code of Laws
When the Germanic traditions mingled with the Roman Law in the post-Migration kingdoms, the mund, which came to be known as mundium, was part of the many code of Laws those kingdoms issued.

It became the responsibility of the closer male relative over non-responsible members of the society, i.e. mostly children and women. As such, it gets mixed up with the guardianship ; but it also protects mothers (Lex Burgundionum art. LIX & LXXXV ; cf. ). It became useless as soon as such a protected member was responsible for himself, as when children grew. Prominent women also could shudder the mundium off.

Advantages
The mund is more of a responsibility than a right, but attached to this responsibility are a list of advantages.

Extension
From this first mund, the principle was extended to the entire tribe, then to several tribes. For example, Early Franks were divided into Salians, scattered in tribes dominated by tribal munds, and Ripuarians, that were all comprised under the mund of a king in Cologne, although he wasn't the king of all the Ripuarians, but only their "protector". This can be seen as an archaic building of the momentum that was eventually to concentrate the coercive power (potestas) and legal violence in the hands of a few, namely the nobles, and later only the monarchs.

The mund came to parallel the principle of auctoritas, without being the same as the kingship.

The mundium regis, for example, was the king's responsibility to protect his subjects and the churches.

The mund passed through to the code of chivalry as a Christian virtue. It passed also, although modified, in modern political conceptions under the term protector. To an extent, the paternalism associated with medieval and modern kingships owes more to the mund than to the elected Germanic kingship.

See also

Use in names
The particle mund is to be found in many Germanic names, and hence passed into some modern names as well. Such names are for example:
 Edmund (Edmond)
 Reginnmund (Raymond)
 Sig(is)mund

Link
 Social History of the Early Middle Ages, Dutch Wikibooks

References
 Olivier Guillot, Yves Sassier,  Pouvoirs et Institutions dans la France Médiévale, t. 1 Des Origines à l'époque féodale, Paris, 2003.
 Deutsches Rechtswörterbuch, dictionary of German legal terms, Deutsches Rechtswörterbuch mit Online-Ausgabe, University of Heidelberg, rzuser.uni-heidelberg.de
 Pardessus J.M., Loi Salique, Paris 1843 ; Dissertation Troisième Remacle.org.

Early Germanic law
Family in early Germanic culture